Pacific 231 is an orchestral work by Arthur Honegger, written in 1923. 

It is one of his most frequently performed works.

Description
The popular interpretation of the piece is that it depicts a steam locomotive, one that is supported by the title of the piece alongside film versions. Honegger explained that he wrote it as an exercise in building momentum while the tempo of the piece slows. He originally titled it Mouvement Symphonique, only giving it the name Pacific 231, a class of steam locomotive designated in Whyte notation as a 4-6-2, with four pilot wheels, six driving wheels, and two trailing wheels (in France, where axles rather than wheels are counted, this arrangement is designated 2-3-1) after it was finished. Honegger was widely known as a train enthusiast, and once notably said: "I have always loved locomotives passionately. For me they are living creatures and I love them as others love women or horses."

Form 
The work consists of five main sections, all of which are delineated consecutively through musical motifs, ostinatos, and other textural demarcations. Each of the sounds are elements of a train and the different soundscapes generated before, during, and at the conclusion of its trip. 

 Standstill
 The start of the locomotive
 Increasing speed
 Driving at top speed
 Deceleration and stop

Accompanying the 1923 published score, Honegger described the long-range form of the work:

Orchestration   
The orchestra consists of: 2 flutes, piccolo flute, 2 oboes, English horn, 2 clarinets, bass clarinet, 2 bassoons, contrabassoon – 4 French horns, 3 trumpets, 3 trombones, tuba, – 4 percussionists (tenor drum, cymbal, bass drum, tam tam) – strings.

Pacific 231 is the first in Honegger's series of three symphonic movements. The other two are Rugby and Mouvement Symphonique No. 3. Honegger lamented that his "poor Symphonic Movement No. 3 paid dearly for its barren title." Critics generally ignored it, while Pacific 231 and Rugby, with more evocative titles, have been written about in depth.

In film

A 1949 award-winning French  film, Pacific 231, directed by Jean Mitry, used the orchestral work as the sound track for a tribute to the steam locomotive, and included close-up footage of driving wheels, running gear and railroad operations, mostly taken at speed, and cut/choreographed to the music.

References
 Honegger, Arthur (1951), trans. Clough, Wilson O. and Willman, Allan Arthur (1966). I am a Composer. London: Faber and Faber Ltd.
 Study score, Salabert, Paris, (1924)

Specific

External links
The 1949 Cannes-winning film on Internet Archive
The 1931 Russian version on YouTube
Pacific 231 (1949) on IMDb

Compositions by Arthur Honegger
Symphonic poems
1923 compositions
Works about rail transport
1949 films
French short films
Rail transport films